The 2023 Aston by-election will be held on 1 April 2023 to elect the next member of the Australian House of Representatives in the electorate of Aston in Victoria. 

The by-election was triggered by the resignation of Liberal MP Alan Tudge, on 17 February 2023.

Background 

Aston has been considered a safe Liberal seat during Tudge's tenure as MP, until becoming a marginal seat at the 2022 election. News of Tudge's resignation prompted speculation that former treasurer Josh Frydenberg, who lost his seat of Kooyong at the 2022 election, would seek the Liberal Party endorsement for the by-election. However, Frydenberg declined to seek re-election, having since moved to the private sector.

The by-election was quickly labelled as key for the Coalition who are in opposition at the federal level and have performed poorly in recent Victorian elections. The last time a government won a seat from the Opposition was the Kalgoorlie by-election in 1920.

2022 election result

Candidate selections 
On 17 February 2023, the ALP selected Mary Doyle as its candidate for the by-election. She had been the party's candidate against Tudge at the 2022 federal election and won preselection unopposed.

On 21 February 2023, the Liberal Party selected Roshena Campbell as its candidate for the by-election. She was selected by the state party's administration committee, a decision taken to avoid the lengthy process of a members' ballot given the relatively short timeframe of the election. If elected, Campbell would be the first female Indian-Australian MP from the Liberal Party. Other candidates for Liberal Party preselection included former state Liberal MP Cathrine Burnett-Wake, former Knox City mayor Emanuele Cicchiello, and oncologist and writer Ranjana Srivastava, who was endorsed by former premier Jeff Kennett.

Neither Campbell nor Doyle live in the seat of Aston.

Key dates
Key dates in relation to the by-election are:
 27 February 2023 – Issue of writ 
 6 March 2023 – Close of electoral rolls 
 9 March 2023 – Close of nominations
 10 March 2023 – Declaration of nominations 
 20 March 2023 – Start of early voting
 29 March 2023 – Postal vote applications close
 1 April 2023 – Polling day (8am to 6pm)
 14 April 2023 – Last day for receipt of postal votes
 TBC 2023 – Declaration of result
 7 June 2023 – Last day for return of writs

Candidates 

One Nation chose not to contest the by-election, with party leader Pauline Hanson stating she had made a "strategic decision not to take votes away from the Coalition".

Simon Holmes à Court, founder of Climate 200, had expressed interest in funding a community-based teal independent if one were to run.

See also 

 List of Australian federal by-elections
 2001 Aston by-election

References

External links
 2023 Aston by-election – Australian Electoral Commission
 Aston by-election – ABC Elections
 Aston by-election, 2023 – The Tally Room

2023 elections in Australia
Victorian federal by-elections